"Bad Habit" is the fourth single by UK band Foals, from their third studio album Holy Fire.
The official video, unveiled on 17 June 2013, was directed by Nabil where visual effects were created by GloriaFX and features lead singer Yannis Philippakis wandering through a desert following a nude woman. The song has been featured in a BBC promotion for its Summer of Music in May 2013.

The single artwork was done by Leif Podhajsky.

Track listing

Charts

References

2013 singles
Foals songs
Song recordings produced by Flood (producer)
2013 songs
Transgressive Records singles
Song recordings produced by Alan Moulder
Music videos directed by Nabil Elderkin
Songs written by Yannis Philippakis